The Nesoi (Greek  "islands"), in ancient Greek religion, were the goddesses of islands. Each island was said to have its own personification. They were classified as one of the  ancient elemental Greek primordial deities. According to Callimachus, the Nesoi were thought to have been Ourea who were cast under the sea during one of Poseidon's rages.

References

Greek goddesses
Greek primordial deities